Pretzsch is a small town and a former municipality in Wittenberg district in Saxony-Anhalt, Germany. Since 1 July 2009, it is part of the town Bad Schmiedeberg.

Geography 

Pretzsch lies in the middle of the Elbauen (natural polders along the Elbe), on the river's west bank which is on the northwest edge of the Düben Heath Nature Park. It is about 20 km southeast of Wittenberg and is the intersection of Federal Highway (Bundesstraße) B 182 between Torgau and Wittenberg, and state road (Landesstraße) L 128 between Bad Schmiedeberg and Jessen.

History
Pretzsch was first mentioned in 981 in one of Otto II's documents. In the 17th century, August II the Strong's wife Christiane Eberhardine of Brandenburg-Bayreuth lived there and is buried in the town church. In the 1930s, the writer Erwin Strittmatter worked at the local bakery. Until 1815, Pretzsch belonged to Saxony, and from then until the Second World War to the Prussian province of Saxony. As of 1952, when East Germany abolished the Land system, Pretzsch was in the Halle region, until 1990 when the Land system was revived in the former East Germany at German Reunification.

The SS Einsatzgruppen, the perpetrators of the initial phase of the Holocaust that preceded the invention of the more efficient Nazi death camp system, were first assembled at a police academy in Pretzsch in the spring of 1941.

Subdivisions
Pretzsch includes the village of Merschwitz.

Sightseeing
 Renaissance stately home from the 16th century
 Wieck'sches Haus from 1725
 Late Gothic church with Baroque additions by Matthäus Daniel Pöppelmann
 Heimatmuseum (half-timbered house) from the 18th century
 Pretzsch Bahnhof, the heritage railway station which starred in the 2009 film The Last Station, standing in for the station in Astapovo, Russia where Leo Tolstoy died.

Personalities
Friedrich Wieck (born 1785 in Pretzsch - died 6 October 1873 in Loschwitz near Dresden) was a German musician and music teacher.

Partner community
  Heuchelheim, Hesse.

See also
 Princess Eleonore Erdmuthe of Saxe-Eisenach

References

External links
 Verwaltungsgemeinschaft's website
 Town's website

Former municipalities in Saxony-Anhalt
Bad Schmiedeberg